The National Society of Film Critics Award for Best Non-Fiction Film is the award given for best feature documentary film at the annual National Society of Film Critics (NSFC) Awards. The category was introduced in 1985 and was originally named Best Documentary.

List of winning films

Notes
± Oscar winner
≠ Oscar nominee

Multiple winners
Agnès Varda - 3
Werner Herzog - 2
Errol Morris - 2
Laura Poitras - 2

References

External links
 National Society of Film Critics Awards at the Internet Movie Database

National Society of Film Critics Awards
American documentary film awards
Awards established in 1984